Rwanda has competed in ten Summer Olympic Games. They have never competed in the Winter Olympic Games.

Rwanda has never won an Olympic medal, but Jean de Dieu Nkundabera won a Paralympic bronze medal for Rwanda in athletics at the 2004 Summer Paralympics in Athens.

Medal tables

Medals by Summer Games

See also
 List of flag bearers for Rwanda at the Olympics
 Rwanda at the Paralympics

References

External links 
 
 
 

 
Olympics